The Konthoujam Lairembi Stone Inscription or Konthoujam Lairemma Stone Inscription is a Meitei language stone inscription found in a sacred site dedicated to Goddess Konthoujam Tampha Lairembi of Sanamahism (Meitei religion) in Konthoujam village of Manipur.

Description 
The stone inscription is in the sacred temple complex of Goddess Konthoujam Tampha Lairembi in the Konthoujam village. It is on the south of the National Highway No. 53 in the west of Imphal city. The stone engaged in this inscription is the sandstone. The inscription consists of 14 lines of writings in Meitei language (Manipuri language) in archaic Meetei script.
Notably, the writings from the fifth to the seventh lines were highly damaged and distorted. So, proper study on these particular lines has been very hard and unsuccessful.

History 
It does not mention any particular date. But paleographic study confirmed that it was written in two different times. The first 7 lines of writings have been assigned to the time of King Khagemba (1592 AD-1652 AD). The remaining 7 lines of writings are assigned to the time of King Charairongba (1697 AD-1709 AD).

Reading 
The inscription shows that King Khagemba assigned compulsory state duty for the Konthoujam clan to worship goddess Huimu Leima. Notably, the Loyumba Shinyen Constitution also assigned the Konthoujam clan to look after the worship of Goddess Huimu Leima, and not Konthousu (Tampha Lairembi). And according to the Konthoujam Nongarol, Goddess Huimu Leima is the mother of goddess Konthoujam Tampha Lairembi (Chingphulon Konthousu), the one married Salailen (Soraren), the king of heaven.

See also 
 Kohima Stone Inscription
 Imphal Peace Museum
 INA War Museum
 Loktak Folklore Museum
 Manipur State Museum
 Sekta Archaeological Living Museum

References

External links 
 Three_millennia_mythology_still_resonates_at_Konthoujam_Lairembi

Meitei culture
Meitei inscriptions
Meitei script